Beech is an unincorporated community in Warren County, Iowa, United States. It is located just north of the intersection of County Road S31 and Highway 92. It is 1 mile east of Sandyville and five miles west of Pleasantville, at 41.3745865N -93.3573103W.

History
Founded in 1911 as a railroad town, Beech was originally known as New Sandyville, but the residents of nearby Sandyville objected to the name. The town was renamed Beech in honor of a railroad employee.

Education
The Pleasantville Community School District operates local public schools.

References

Unincorporated communities in Warren County, Iowa
Populated places established in 1911
Unincorporated communities in Iowa
1911 establishments in Iowa